Jeanson is a surname. Notable people with the surname include:

Geneviève Jeanson (born 1981), Canadian cyclist
Guillaume Jeanson (born 1721), Canadian settler
Henri Jeanson (1900–1970), French writer and journalist

See also
Jeanson network, French militant communist group